Megan Fairchild (born October 23, 1984) is an American ballet dancer. She is currently a principal dancer with the New York City Ballet.

Early life
Fairchild was born in Salt Lake City, Utah, and began her dance training at the age of four, studying with Judy Levitre and Kaelynne Oliphant at Dance Concepts in Sandy, Utah, and at the Ballet West Conservatory in Salt Lake City with Sharee Lane, Deborah Dobson, and Maureen Laird. While at the Ballet West Conservatory, Ms. Fairchild was also a Ballet West trainee. Ms. Fairchild entered the School of American Ballet (SAB), the official school of New York City Ballet, in the fall of 2000. 

Her brother, Robert Fairchild was also a principal with the company. She and her brother are both recipients of the Mae L. Wien Award at the School of American Ballet.

Career
In November 2001, Fairchild joined the New York City Ballet as an apprentice, and in October 2002 she joined the Company became a member of the corps de ballet. Fairchild was promoted to the rank of soloist in February 2004, and in January 2005, she was promoted to principal dancer.

In 2011, she danced the role of Sugar Plum Fairy in a telecast of The Nutcracker.

Fairchild made her Broadway stage debut playing the role of Ivy Smith in the 2014 revival of On the Town, which opened on October 16, 2014 at the Lyric Theatre. She received the 2015 Theatre World Award for her performance. She is currently a Teaching Fellow with the School of American Ballet.

Fairchild defended Peter Martins, then Ballet Master in Chief of the New York City Ballet, when he was accused of physical and sexual abuse. She said she felt safe working with him.

Selected repertoire
George Balanchine
Apollo (Calliope)
Ballo della Regina
Coppélia (Swanilda)
"Emeralds" and "Rubies" from Jewels
The Nutcracker (Sugarplum Fairy, Dewdrop, Marzipan, Dolls)
Harlequinade (Pierrette)
A Midsummer Night's Dream (Butterfly, Divertissement)
Raymonda Variations
Serenade
Symphony in C (First Movement, Third Movement)
Tschaikovsky Pas de Deux
Theme and Variations

August Bournonville
La Sylphide (The Sylph)

Peter Martins
The Sleeping Beauty (Aurora, Ruby, Princess Florine)
Swan Lake (Odette/Odile, Pas de Trois, Pas de Quatre, Neapolitan)

Jerome Robbins
Dances at a Gathering

Created roles 
Robert La Fosse: Land of Nod (Natalie)
Peter Martins: Bal de Couture, Naïve and Sentimental Music
Angelin Preljocaj: Spectral Evidence
Alexei Ratmansky: Namouna, A Grand Divertissement, Voices
Susan Stroman: "The Blue Necklace" from Double Feature (Florence)
Christopher Wheeldon: Shambards

Personal life
In 2011, Fairchild married fellow New York City Ballet principal Andrew Veyette, but they quietly divorced in 2017. She is the mother of three daughters, including a pair of twins. She has a degree in mathematics and economics from Fordham University and is currently studying for an M.B.A. at New York University.

From 2014 to 2017, Fairchild was the sister-in-law of fellow dancer Tiler Peck, through Peck's marriage to Megan's brother Robert.

Awards and nominations

References

External links
 Cupcakes & Conversation with Megan Fairchild. Ballet News. 9 July 2010.

New York City Ballet principal dancers
Living people
American ballerinas
Artists from Salt Lake City
School of American Ballet alumni
Mae L. Wien Award recipients
1984 births
Theatre World Award winners